"Real to Me" is a pop song written by Merril Bainbridge and recorded by Australian pop singer Lydia Denker and released as a CD single on 10 October 2000. The song had heavy radio play on 2Day FM and a remix featured on the Big Brother Season One compilation CD.

Despite this, the song did not chart on the ARIA charts.

Track listing
yirota: yighayara yokughutho eyi gha karanga nayo munu, eyi gha ka kumitha mo.
dimbo: mughuma ghoghuwa oghu ha shwaghithanga hanu mumanando

"Real to Me" (Xtreme Big Brother mix)
"Real to Me" (Phat Beatz mix)
"Real to Me" (Astro Boyz Club mix)

References

2000 debut singles
Songs written by Merril Bainbridge
2000 songs